Adam Blyth (born 24 October 1981) is an Australian professional golfer.

Blyth turned professional in 2004. He plays on the PGA Tour of Australasia and also played on the Asian Tour from 2005 to 2013. On the PGA Tour of Australasia, he won twice in 2016: the South Pacific Open Championship and the New South Wales Open. On the Asian Tour, he has three runner-up finishes: 2007 Pine Valley Beijing Open, 2009 Pertamina Indonesia President Invitational, and the 2012 Zaykabar Myanmar Open; where he was defeated in a three-man playoff.

Professional wins (2)

PGA Tour of Australasia wins (2)

PGA Tour of Australasia playoff record (1–0)

Playoff record
Asian Tour playoff record (0–1)

Results in major championships

CUT = missed the halfway cut
Note: Blyth only played in The Open Championship.

Team appearances
Amateur
Australian Men's Interstate Teams Matches (representing Queensland): 2003, 2004 (winners)

References

External links

Australian male golfers
PGA Tour of Australasia golfers
Asian Tour golfers
Golfers from Brisbane
1981 births
Living people